Eurosolar - European Association for Renewable Energies (Own spelling: EUROSOLAR) is a German association with headquarters in Bonn. The association has sections in 13 countries (Germany, Bulgaria, Denmark, Georgia, Italy, Luxembourg, Austria, Russia, Spain, Czech Republic, Turkey, Ukraine and Hungary).

Eurosolar is the non-profit European Association for Renewable Energy that conducts its work independently of political parties, institutions, commercial enterprises, and interest groups. Eurosolar develops and encourages political and economic action plans and concepts for the introduction of renewable energy.  Eurosolar has approximately 2,500 members, close to 400 legal groups,  and owns the Solar Age magazine, published quarterly.  A history of the association is available.

Formed on 2 August 1988 in Bonn, West Germany, Eurosolar runs an annual event called the Solar Prize awards, rewarding progress in renewable energy.

See also
 Hermann Scheer, former president
 German Renewable Energy Sources Act, Eurosolar was active during its inception in 1991 and subsequent development
 International Solar Alliance

References

External links
 

Environmental organisations based in Germany
International organisations based in Bonn
Solar energy in the European Union
Solar energy organizations